The Constructive Cost Model (COCOMO) is a procedural software cost estimation model developed by Barry W. Boehm. The model parameters are derived from fitting a regression formula using data from historical projects (63 projects for COCOMO 81 and 163 projects for COCOMO II).

History 

The constructive cost model was developed by Barry W. Boehm in the late 1970s and published in Boehm's 1981 book Software Engineering Economics as a model for estimating effort, cost, and schedule for software projects. It drew on a study of 63 projects at TRW Aerospace where Boehm was Director of Software Research and Technology. The study examined projects ranging in size from 2,000 to 100,000 lines of code, and programming languages ranging from assembly to PL/I. These projects were based on the waterfall model of software development which was the  prevalent software development process in 1981.

References to this model typically call it COCOMO 81. In 1995 COCOMO II was developed and finally published in 2000 in the book Software Cost Estimation with COCOMO II. COCOMO II is the successor of COCOMO 81 and is claimed to be better suited for estimating modern software development projects; providing support for more recent software development processes and was tuned using a larger database of 161 projects. The need for the new model came as software development technology moved from mainframe and overnight batch processing to desktop development, code reusability, and the use of off-the-shelf software components.

COCOMO consists of a hierarchy of three increasingly detailed and accurate forms. The first level, Basic COCOMO is good for quick, early, rough order of magnitude estimates of software costs, but its accuracy is limited due to its lack of factors to account for difference in project attributes (Cost Drivers). Intermediate COCOMO takes these Cost Drivers into account and Detailed COCOMO additionally accounts for the influence of individual project phases.
Last one is Complete COCOMO model which addresses the shortcomings of both basic & intermediate.

Intermediate COCOMOs 
Intermediate COCOMO computes software development effort as function of program size and a set of "cost drivers" that include subjective assessment of product, hardware, personnel and project attributes. This extension considers a set of four "cost drivers", each with a number of subsidiary attributes:-

 Product attributes
 Required software reliability extent
 Size of application database
 Complexity of the product
 Hardware attributes
 Run-time performance constraints
 Memory constraints
 Volatility of the virtual machine environment
 Required turnabout time
 Personnel attributes
 Analyst capability
 Software engineering capability
 Applications experience
 Virtual machine experience
 Programming language experience
 Project attributes
 Use of software tools
 Application of software engineering methods
 Required development schedule

Each of the 15 attributes receives a rating on a six-point scale that ranges from "very low" to "extra high" (in importance or value). An effort multiplier from the table below applies to the rating. The product of all effort multipliers results in an effort adjustment factor (EAF). Typical values for EAF range from 0.9 to 1.4.

The Intermediate Cocomo formula now takes the form:

where E is the effort applied in person-months, KLoC is the estimated number of thousands of delivered lines of code for the project, and EAF is the factor calculated above. The coefficient ai and the exponent bi are given in the next table.

{|  class="wikitable"
!Software project
!width="20%"|ai
!width="20%"|bi
!width="20%"|ci
|-
! Organic
|align="center"|3.2
|align="center"|1.05
|align="center"|0.38
|-
! Semi-detached
|align="center"|3.0
|align="center"|1.12
|align="center"|0.35
|-
! Embedded
|align="center"|2.8
|align="center"|1.20
|align="center"|0.32
|}

The Development time D and also the most effective number of Persons P calculation uses E in the same way as in the Basic COCOMO:

Note that in addition to the EAF, the parameter ai is different in Intermediate COCOMO from the Basic model:

{|  class="wikitable"
!Software project
!width="20%"|ab
|-
! Organic
|align="center"|2.4
|-
! Semi-detached
|align="center"|3.0
|-
! Embedded
|align="center"|3.6
|}

The parameters b and c are the same in both models.

See also 
 Comparison of development estimation software
 Cost overrun
 COSYSMO
 Estimation in software engineering
 Function point
 Object point
 Putnam model
 SEER-SEM
 Software development effort estimation
 Software engineering economics
 PRICE Systems

References

Further reading

External links 

 COCOMO 81 data on tera-PROMISE
 Analysis of the COCOMO 81 data obtains a different value for the Organic exponent.

Software engineering costs